Joseph Agyemang-Gyau (3 June 1939 – 14 May 2015), also known as Agyemang Gyau or Nana Gyau, was
a former Ghanaian international football player and traditional ruler.

Club career
Agyeman-Gyau started his career as an amateur in his home country playing for Real Republicans and then B/A United. In 1968, he moved to the United States to play football professionally, and played for Washington Whips in the inaugural North American Soccer League season, scoring four goals in 15 games for the club. After the dissolution of the Whips at the end of the season, he joined Washington Darts, where he won the American Soccer League title in 1969. The Darts joined the NASL for the following season, and Agyeman-Gyau appeared 19 times, scoring five goals. He went on to play another two seasons in the ASL with Baltimore Bays before joining his third NASL club Washington Diplomats in 1974, playing seven league games and scoring one goal.

International career
Agyeman-Gyau began representing Ghana in 1960, and went on to win two African Cup of Nations titles with the team in 1963 and 1965. He also represented the team in the 1964 Summer Olympics, scoring in a 3–2 win against Japan before Ghana were eliminated in the quarter finals of the tournament. He continued to play for Ghana until 1968 when he moved to the United States.

Personal life
Agyeman-Gyau was married to his wife for 50 years, Mary. He was the father of four children; Christiana, Emmanuel, Amy and Philip Gyau. He was also a grandfather of 7 which includes Joe Gyau who followed in his father's and grandfather's footsteps as a professional soccer player. He later returned to Ghana, where he was appointed as a traditional ruler, becoming the Atipimhene of Berekum. He died on 14 May 2015.

References

External links
 
 

1939 births
2015 deaths
Ghanaian footballers
Ghana international footballers
1963 African Cup of Nations players
1965 African Cup of Nations players
Olympic footballers of Ghana
Footballers at the 1964 Summer Olympics
Washington Whips players
Washington Darts players
Baltimore Bays (1972–73) players
Washington Diplomats (NASL) players
North American Soccer League (1968–1984) players
Ghanaian expatriate footballers
Expatriate soccer players in the United States
Ghanaian expatriate sportspeople in the United States
Africa Cup of Nations-winning players
Association football midfielders